St. Charles Borromeo Parish is a Roman Catholic church located on the East Side neighborhood of Bridgeport, Connecticut, part of the  Diocese of Bridgeport. Its architecture is Gothic Revival. St. Charles Borromeo has masses in different languages, such as Spanish, Portuguese, French- Creole and English.

External links 
 St. Charles Borromeo - Diocesan information 
 Diocese of Bridgeport

Roman Catholic churches in Bridgeport, Connecticut
Roman Catholic Diocese of Bridgeport